Saint-Sulpice-sur-Lèze (literally Saint-Sulpice on Lèze; Languedocien: Sent Somplesi) is a commune in the Haute-Garonne department in southwestern France.

Geography
The Lèze forms part of the commune's southwestern border, flows north through the western part of the commune, crosses the village and forms part of its northwestern border.

Population

See also
Communes of the Haute-Garonne department

References

Communes of Haute-Garonne